Charles "Cholly" Atkins (born Charles Sylvan Atkinson; September 13, 1913 – April 19, 2003) was an American dancer and vaudeville performer, who later became noted as the house choreographer for the various artists on the Motown label.

Biography
Born in Pratt City, Alabama, Cholly Atkins began dancing in the late 1930s before entering military service in 1942 during World War II. Upon leaving the U.S. Army. Atkins first found fame as one-half of Atkins & Coles, a top vaudeville dance act with partner Charles "Honi" Coles, debuting at the Apollo Theater in Harlem, New York. Atkins and Coles toured extensively nationally and internationally, performing in showcases with major jazz and swing bands, including those led by Louis Armstrong, Charlie Barnet, Count Basie, Cab Calloway, and Lionel Hampton.  The pair also performed from 1949 to 1952 on Broadway in the stage 4 production, Gentlemen Prefer Blondes.

In the mid-1950s, Cholly began teaching dance steps to the Cadillacs, Shirelles, Moonglows, Frankie Lymon & the Teenagers, Little Anthony & The Imperials, and other vocal groups. His dance steps were a new style coined "vocal choreography", as singers enhanced their vocal performances with stylish combinations of gestures and steps.  After working as a freelance choreographer in 1962 for The Miracles, Atkins was hired by Berry Gordy to work as a Motown choreographer in 1964, and set about developing the routines that would later become the trademark moves of other Motown acts like The Supremes, The Temptations (Atkins was also featured in the video for their hit single "Lady Soul"), The Four Tops, The Marvelettes, Gladys Knight & The Pips and others. Atkins would, in fact, continue working with Motown artists well into the 1980s.  He choreographed for non-Motown artists as well, namely the dance routines of The Cadillacs in the 1950s, and the Sylvers, as well as The O'Jays during the mid-1970s, appearing with them on an episode of Soul Train. He also worked with Detroit rock band DC Drive and is featured in the "You Need Love" video.

In 1989, Atkins received a Tony Award for choreographing the Broadway show Black and Blue. He also accepted a 1993 National Endowment for the Arts three-year fellowship to tour colleges and universities teaching vocal choreography.  He continued to teach dance in Las Vegas until February 2003.

Death 
Diagnosed with pancreatic cancer in March 2003, Atkins died of the cancer several weeks later on April 19, 2003 in Las Vegas, Nevada.  He was five months short of his 90th birthday.

Family 
Marriages
 Atkins married Catherine Gayle Williams (maiden; born 1914) November 27, 1936, in Los Angeles.  They were divorced in 1944.  She had been a dancer at the chorus line of Cotton Club productions.  After leaving show business in 1942, Williams went on to earn a master's degree in Social Work from the University of Iowa and has had a distinguished career in Iowa in social work.
 1932: Valedictorian, North High School, Des Moines
 1980: Williams was inducted into the Iowa Women's Hall of Fame
 November 21, 2014: Williams was honored by the Iowa House of Representatives for her life's work and in celebration of her 100th birthday
 Atkins married Dorothy ("Dottie") Lee Saulters (maiden; 1922–1962) September 2, 1944, in Wilmington, Delaware, while he was in the U.S. Army.  Dottie, who had become his dance partner in 1942, had been married to Honi Coles from 1936 to 1944; Coles had been a longtime dance partner in shows with Atkins, and continued to perform with Atkins
 Atkins married Maye Ollie Harrison (1918–2004) and remained married to her until his death.

References

General 
 
 Lewis Segal (2003-04-23). "Cholly Atkins, 89; Tap Dancer, Motown Stars' Choreographer". Los Angeles Times. Retrieved 2015-09-03.

Inline

External links

 
 
 
 Finding aid to the Cholly Atkins collection at Columbia University. Rare Book & Manuscript Library.

Selected videos 
 , Coles and Atkins (dance duet) (recording date unknown)

 Willie Bryant, announcer; accompanied by the Apollo Theater house band (the Paul Williams Band); Paul "Hucklebuck" Williams is in the checked jacket on bari sax 
 , Soul Train October 11, 1975 on YouTube
 , and discussing Cholly Atkins' choreography of the number

American choreographers
American tap dancers
Deaths from pancreatic cancer
Motown artists
Artists from Birmingham, Alabama
Vaudeville performers
Tony Award winners
Deaths from cancer in Nevada
African-American male dancers
African-American dancers
American male dancers
1913 births
2003 deaths
African-American choreographers
20th-century American dancers
African Americans in World War II
United States Army personnel of World War II
African-American United States Army personnel